JPCA may refer to:

 The Journal of Physical Chemistry A, a scientific journal 
 Japan Photographic Copyright Association a copyright collection society
 Japan Postal Chess Association, an ICCF national member federation
 Japan Primary Care Association, an academic association for family medicine doctors in Japan